Washington Valley is a major inner suburb of Nelson, New Zealand. It lies to the west of Nelson city centre and south of Stepneyville and Beachville.

The equivalent Statistics New Zealand statistical area of Washington covers a land area of 1.12 km².

The suburb has three local parks: Abraham Heights Reserve, Sequoia Reserve and Wolfe Reserve.

History

The estimated population of Washington reached 2,510 in 1996, before dropping to 2,450 in 2001.

It reached 2,526 in 2006, 2,469 in 2013, and 2,847 in 2018.

Demography

Washington had a population of 2,847 at the 2018 New Zealand census, an increase of 378 people (15.3%) since the 2013 census, and an increase of 321 people (12.7%) since the 2006 census. There were 1,011 households. There were 1,437 males and 1,413 females, giving a sex ratio of 1.02 males per female. The median age was 33.4 years (compared with 37.4 years nationally), with 573 people (20.1%) aged under 15 years, 672 (23.6%) aged 15 to 29, 1,299 (45.6%) aged 30 to 64, and 303 (10.6%) aged 65 or older.

Ethnicities were 74.9% European/Pākehā, 14.3% Māori, 3.6% Pacific peoples, 15.0% Asian, and 3.5% other ethnicities (totals add to more than 100% since people could identify with multiple ethnicities).

The proportion of people born overseas was 29.9%, compared with 27.1% nationally.

Although some people objected to giving their religion, 53.7% had no religion, 29.7% were Christian, 1.9% were Hindu, 0.1% were Muslim, 2.8% were Buddhist and 3.6% had other religions.

Of those at least 15 years old, 507 (22.3%) people had a bachelor or higher degree, and 396 (17.4%) people had no formal qualifications. The median income was $28,700, compared with $31,800 nationally. The employment status of those at least 15 was that 1,149 (50.5%) people were employed full-time, 435 (19.1%) were part-time, and 81 (3.6%) were unemployed.

Economy

In 2018, 11.5% worked in manufacturing, 7.6% worked in construction, 11.0% worked in hospitality, 3.4% worked in transport, 6.2% worked in education, and 11.2% worked in healthcare.

Transport

As of 2018, among those who commuted to work, 67.1% drove a car, 5.7% rode in a car, 4.7% use a bike, and 4.7% walk or run.

No one used public transport.

References

Suburbs of Nelson, New Zealand
Populated places in the Nelson Region